The Grants-Milan Flight Service Station, at 1116 N. Dale Carnutte Rd. in Grants, New Mexico, was added to the National Register of Historic Places in 2015.

It was then part of the Western New Mexico Aviation Heritage Museum, which honors early aviation pioneers who flew the Los Angeles-to-Amarillo segment of the Midcontinental Airway.

It is a flight service station that was built in 1953 to serve the Grants-Milan Municipal Airport.

Western New Mexico Aviation Heritage Museum
The Western New Mexico Aviation Heritage Museum is a small aviation museum located at the Grants-Milan airport (KGNT) in Grants, New Mexico.  It was dedicated on June 9, 2012.

It commemorates the Los Angeles to Amarillo segment of the Transcontinental Air Transport, an early air mail provider.  It consists of two 1929 structures: a 55-foot beacon tower and a small building with a generator. It also has a concrete arrow which helped aviators find the correct direction to continue in.

References

External links

official site

Museums in Cibola County, New Mexico
Aerospace museums in New Mexico
National Register of Historic Places in Cibola County, New Mexico
Transportation buildings and structures on the National Register of Historic Places in New Mexico
Commercial buildings in New Mexico
Commercial buildings completed in 1953
History museums in New Mexico